Emery L. Frazier (September 24, 1896 – April 24, 1973) was a Kentucky politician who served as secretary of the United States Senate.

Born in Railey Station in Woodford County, Kentucky, he interrupted his studies at the University of Kentucky in 1917 to enlist in the Army. After serving during World War I, he completed his degree and was admitted to the Kentucky Bar in 1921. He was elected to the Kentucky House of Representatives in 1922, later served as reading clerk of the House, and was elected mayor of the City of Whitesburg.

Frazier was reading clerk for the Democratic National Convention in 1932, when he followed his friend, Senator Alben W. Barkley, to Washington, D.C. There, Frazier was appointed legislative clerk of the Senate that year and served until 1948, when he was appointed Chief Clerk of the Senate. Frazier ascended to Secretary of the U.S. Senate on January 1, 1966, the twentieth person to hold that title, and he served for nine months before leaving the office and being appointed by the Senate to work on a history of the body. Frazier continued that work until 1970, when he retired because of illness.

References

External links
Senate Biography

1896 births
1973 deaths
People from Woodford County, Kentucky
Democratic Party members of the Kentucky House of Representatives
People from Whitesburg, Kentucky
Mayors of places in Kentucky
Military personnel from Kentucky
United States Army personnel of World War I
United States Army soldiers
20th-century American politicians